Jessica Salazar (born 21 September 1995) is a Mexican professional track cyclist. She rode in the women's team sprint event at the 2016 UCI Track Cycling World Championships. At the 2016 Pan American Track Cycling Championships, she broke the world record in the 500m time trial.

Major results
2014
2nd Team Sprint, Copa Internacional de Pista (with Perla Merari Loera)
2015
Pan American Track Championships
1st  Team Sprint (with Daniela Gaxiola)
1st  500m Time Trial
3rd Keirin
2nd Sprint, Copa Cuba de Pista
2016
Pan American Track Championships
1st  Sprint
1st  Team Sprint (with Yuli Verdugo)
1st  500m Time Trial

References

External links
 

1995 births
Living people
Mexican female cyclists
Sportspeople from Guadalajara, Jalisco
Mexican track cyclists
Cyclists at the 2019 Pan American Games
Pan American Games medalists in cycling
Pan American Games gold medalists for Mexico
Medalists at the 2019 Pan American Games
Olympic cyclists of Mexico
Cyclists at the 2020 Summer Olympics
20th-century Mexican women
21st-century Mexican women
Competitors at the 2018 Central American and Caribbean Games